Tsaratanana Airport is an airport in Tsaratanana, Betsiboka Region, Madagascar .

Airlines and destinations

References

Airports in Madagascar
Betsiboka